Zaal Samadashvili (born 3 October 1953) is a Georgian writer.

The biography
Zaal Samadashvili graduated from Tbilisi State University, where he studied mathematics.

He says: 'I wish each of us was not only proud of living in Tbilisi but I wish all of us had a desire and an opportunity to do as much as possible for the Capital. So that every single person could awake and deepen the responsibility towards the house, the street and the square where they live at present, where his ancestors had lived and where his descendants will live in future.'

Author of several full-length film scripts, he has published five collected stories. He is the chairman of the Tbilisi City Assembly.

Samadashvili initiated the Gala literary prize, which is awarded under the aegis of the Tbilisi City Assembly.

Job Description
 1977 Hydro-Electric Research Institute Laboratory Assistant
 1978–1980 Geological Expedition Caucasus Mineral Raw Materials Institute-Engineer
 Technical University of Georgia, Department of Automation and Telemechanics junior member of research staff
 1983–1989 Film studio "Georgian Film's Creative Union of Writers Probationer
 1989–1994 Newspaper "Mamuli" Deputy Editor. Literary magazine "XX Saukune – Editor. Georgian Technical University Humanitarian Faculty lecturer
 2005–2007 Tbilisi Public School No. 53 – Principal
 2006 Tbilisi City Assembly – Member
 2008 to date Tbilisi City Assembly – Chairman

Works

Books
 As hoarse song on the guitar (1994) – 
 As an old Italian films (1999) – 
 The fire in smoked glass (2001) – 
 Gypsies (2003) – 
 Plekhanov News (2004) – 
 How to love one another (2004) – 
 Sandro Kandelaki's Boot (2006) – 
 Stories for Boys (2010) -

Movie
 Temo, 'Georgian television films', director Levan Zakareishvili, 1986

References

External links
 Zaal Samadashvili
 Samadašvili, Zaal
 Zaal Samadašvili
 Samadashvili Zaal

Writers from Tbilisi
1953 births
Living people
Screenwriters from Georgia (country)
Translators from Georgia (country)
Recipients of the Presidential Order of Excellence